The Piti Guns or Piti Coastal Defense Guns is the site of three Vickers-type Model 3  coastal defense guns in the War in the Pacific National Historical Park in Piti, Guam. The Japanese manufactured these Model 3 coastal defense guns in 1914. During the Japanese Occupation of Guam from 1941 to 1944, they built up defensive positions on the island. The Chamorro population was forced to work in building up these defenses, and did so here at the Piti Guns.

The Piti guns were strategically placed in a village consisting mostly of rice paddies in 1944. This area was chosen to defend the beach at Asan from a possible invasion. When the United States Armed Forces came to retake the island on July 21, 1944, these guns were not fully operational. Consequently, not one of the three coastal defense guns was ever fired. However, these guns are representative of the type of weapons used by the Japanese on Guam for fortification efforts.

Visiting
The Piti Guns are located in the War in the Pacific National Historical Park in Piti, Guam, and are freely accessible by the general public.  The trailhead is located at  13.4621N, 144.6942E in a residential neighborhood behind a church social hall on Father Mel Street in Piti, Guam.  The guns are located a short walk up a staircase from the trailhead.

References

External links

World War II weapons of Japan
World War II on the National Register of Historic Places in Guam
History of Guam
Buildings and structures on the National Register of Historic Places in Guam
1944 establishments in Guam